Miga is a Local Government Area of Jigawa State, Nigeria. Its headquarters are in the town of Miga.

It has an area of 586 km and a population of 128,424 at the 2006 census.

The postal code of the area is 720.

References

Local Government Areas in Jigawa State